Palaquium rivulare is a tree in the family Sapotaceae. The specific epithet rivulare means "inhabiting rivers".

Description
The bark is pale brown. Inflorescences bear up to 10 brownish flowers.

Distribution and habitat
Palaquium rivulare is endemic to Borneo. Habitat is mixed dipterocarp, limestone and  riparian forests.

References

rivulare
Endemic flora of Borneo
Trees of Borneo
Plants described in 1927